"Lying In State" is a song by American thrash metal band Megadeth. It is the ninth track from their fifteenth studio album, Dystopia, which was released on January 22, 2016. The song's music video was released for the band's 35th anniversary on January 31, 2018.

Music and lyrics

"Lying In State" is the second part of 'Conquer Or Die'. Megadeth frontman Dave Mustaine commented, "Those two parts were supposed to be sequenced together. So it goes 'Conquer Or Die… Lying In State'." "Lying in State" is also fastest song on Dystopia, and is in the key of D major.

Mustaine also said about the song: "'Lying In State' part is a double entendre which I'm pretty familiar with doing. The 'lying in state' was a place where you… Once you die, you're lying in state for all to see. Or, right now, with people who are still upright, standing by the podium, lying in a position of state." (The song) talks about how I've seen the world change in the years that I've been alive. I guess the double entendre came from watching a lot of these politicians, you just know when they're asked a question the answer is such spin, somebody that doesn't know shit is gonna go, 'Oh, I get it,' because they don't wanna say, 'I have no idea what he just said.' But for me, since I watch a lot of political pundits to try to get inspiration for songs, I see when people are spinning stuff, and to me that's lying in state."

Music video
The music video for "Lying in State" features Megadeth mascot Vic Rattlehead rescuing a young boy from a graveyard, while the band plays inside of a tomb. The video was directed by Leo Liberti, who also directed part one (Conquer or Die!)'s music video.

The video was first announced in November, 2017.

Critical reception
Although the song was ranked at only number 7 in Return of Rock's ranking of Dystopia, it was spoken of fondly. "Right from the get go, it’s straight forward, in your face pulverizing thrash. The rumbling, catastrophic riffing is reminiscent of “Blackmail the Universe” off their 2004 TSHF album. Crushing riffs to go along with Chris Adler’s blitzkrieg double bass and a terrific vocal performance from Mustaine make “Lying In State” a standout track." An author from Rockpasta had a very good opinion of the music video, stating "You will love everything on this new music video, the suits, the effects, and on top of that, the great freaking song!"

Personnel
Credits adapted from Dystopia liner notes, unless otherwise noted.

Megadeth
Dave Mustaine – guitars, lead vocals
David Ellefson – bass, backing vocals
Kiko Loureiro – guitars, backing vocals
Chris Adler – drums

Additional musicians
Chris Rodriguez  – backing vocals
Eric Darken – percussion
Blair Masters – keyboards & programming

Production and design
Produced by Dave Mustaine and Chris Rakestraw
Engineering by Chris Rakestraw
Mixed by Josh Wilbur
Pre-production by Cameron Webb
Additional production by Jeff Balding
Mastering by Ted Jensen
Brent Elliott White – cover artwork

References

External links
 
 Music video

2016 songs
Megadeth songs
Songs written by Dave Mustaine